Correggio may refer to:
Correggio, Emilia-Romagna, Italy
Antonio da Correggio, Italian Renaissance painter
Niccolò da Correggio (1450–1508), an Italian poet
Joseph Kaspar Correggio (1870–1962), German painter
 Correggio, a tragedy written by Adam Oehlenschläger in 1811